Al Meltzer (June 26, 1928June 12, 2018), nicknamed "Big Al", was an American sportscaster.

Born in Syracuse, New York, Meltzer worked for Channel 10 and Channel 3 in Philadelphia, and Comcast SportsNet (as sports director). He also worked for WPHL-17 where he called play-by-play of Big 5 and 76ers basketball. He has also covered the Philadelphia Eagles, Philadelphia Phillies, and Temple Owls. Previously, he worked in Buffalo, New York at WEBR. He is a member of the Jewish Sports Hall of Fame, Big 5 Hall of Fame, the Philadelphia Sports Hall of Fame and  Broadcast Pioneers of Philadelphia Hall of Fame. During the 1970s, Meltzer, while still living in Philadelphia, commuted to Buffalo to serve as the Buffalo Bills Radio Network play-by-play announcer, serving on a team with Rick Azar and Ed Rutkowski. He died at the age of 89 on June 12, 2018.

Meltzer occasionally did voice-over work for NFL Films and was a substitute host for NFL Films' weekly wrapup, This Week in Pro Football (This Week in the NFL starting in 1974).

References

1928 births
2018 deaths
People from Newtown Township, Delaware County, Pennsylvania
Television personalities from Syracuse, New York
St. Lawrence University alumni
American Jews
American television sports announcers
American radio sports announcers
Buffalo Bills announcers
College football announcers
College basketball announcers in the United States
Major League Baseball broadcasters
National Basketball Association broadcasters
National Football League announcers
Philadelphia 76ers announcers
Philadelphia Phillies announcers
North American Soccer League (1968–1984) commentators